The Light heavyweight competition at the 2023 IBA Women's World Boxing Championships will be held between 17 and 25 March 2023.

Results

References

External links
Draw

Light heavyweight